Prus II Wilczekosy is a Polish coat of arms. It was used by several szlachta families in the times of the Polish–Lithuanian Commonwealth.

Blazon

Notable bearers

Notable bearers of this coat of arms include:
Armorial du Premier Empire Florian baron Kobyliński h. Prus II
Walerian Olszowski(*1587–†1650) First Senator of the Olszowski h. Prus II family - His father was Mikołaj O., his grandfather Jan Mikołaj O. and great grandfather was Mikołaj Niczek Czchodorff O. His son was:
Andrzej III Olszowski – 1674–1677 Archbishop of Gniezno and Primate of Poland and Crowned Jan Sobieski 1676

External links 
  Prus 2nd Coat of Arms and bearers

See also

 List of Polish nobility coats of arms
 Olszowa

Sources 
 Dynastic Genealogy
 Ornatowski.com

Prus II